Drouwenerveen is a village in the Dutch province of Drenthe. It is a part of the municipality of Borger-Odoorn and lies about 20 km east of Assen.

The village was first mentioned in 1781 as "Gasselter en Drouwer Veenen", and means "the peat area belonging to Drouwen". Drouwererveen started as a peat excavation village around 1820, and is a linear settlement along the road from Drouwen.

Drouwenerveen was home to 305 people in 1840. The Dutch Reformed church was built around 1915, and has become a residential house.

References

Populated places in Drenthe
Borger-Odoorn